USNS City of Bismarck (JHSV-9/T-EPF-9), (ex-Sacrifice) is the ninth  and operated by the United States Navys Military Sealift Command.  It is the first ship in naval service named after Bismarck, North Dakota’s capital city.

Construction and career 
The ship's name was announced in 2016 as Bismarck. The keel was laid on 18 January 2017, by which point the ship's name had been changed to City of Bismarck. The state of North Dakota was represented at the ceremony by Robert O. Wefald, a retired Navy officer, former state Attorney General, and longtime resident of Bismarck. Wefald welded his initials into a steel plate that would be incorporated into the ship.

On 7 June 2017, USNS City of Bismarck was launched at Austal USA in Mobile, Alabama. The City of Bismarck completed acceptance trials on 20 October 2017 and its delivery was accepted by the U.S. Navy on 19 December 2017.

References

External links

Transports of the United States Navy
Ships built in Mobile, Alabama
Spearhead-class Joint High Speed Vessels
2017 ships